Events in the year 1898 in Germany.

Incumbents

National level
 Kaiser – Wilhelm II
 Chancellor – Chlodwig, Prince of Hohenlohe-Schillingsfürst

State level

Kingdoms
 King of Bavaria – Otto of Bavaria
 King of Prussia – Kaiser Wilhelm II
 King of Saxony – Albert of Saxony
 King of Württemberg – William II of Württemberg

Grand Duchies
 Grand Duke of Baden – Frederick I
 Grand Duke of Hesse – Ernest Louis
 Grand Duke of Mecklenburg-Schwerin – Frederick Francis IV
 Grand Duke of Mecklenburg-Strelitz – Frederick William
 Grand Duke of Oldenburg – Peter II
 Grand Duke of Saxe-Weimar-Eisenach – Charles Alexander

Principalities
 Schaumburg-Lippe – George, Prince of Schaumburg-Lippe
 Schwarzburg-Rudolstadt – Günther Victor, Prince of Schwarzburg-Rudolstadt
 Schwarzburg-Sondershausen – Karl Günther, Prince of Schwarzburg-Sondershausen
 Principality of Lippe – Alexander, Prince of Lippe (with Ernest II, Count of Lippe-Biesterfeld, as regent)
 Reuss Elder Line – Heinrich XXII, Prince Reuss of Greiz
 Reuss Younger Line – Heinrich XIV, Prince Reuss Younger Line
 Waldeck and Pyrmont – Friedrich, Prince of Waldeck and Pyrmont

Duchies
 Duke of Anhalt – Frederick I, Duke of Anhalt
 Duke of Brunswick – Prince Albert of Prussia (regent)
 Duke of Saxe-Altenburg – Ernst I, Duke of Saxe-Altenburg
 Duke of Saxe-Coburg and Gotha – Alfred, Duke of Saxe-Coburg and Gotha
 Duke of Saxe-Meiningen – Georg II, Duke of Saxe-Meiningen

Colonial governors
 Cameroon (Kamerun) – Jesko von Puttkamer (5th term) to 12 January, then Theodor Seitz (2nd term) to 13 October, then again Jesko von Puttkamer (6th term) from 14 October
 Kiautschou – Carl Rosendahl from 7 March
 German East Africa (Deutsch-Ostafrika) – Eduard von Liebert
 German New Guinea (Deutsch-Neuguinea) – Hugo Skopnik (Landeshauptleute of the German New Guinea Company)
 German South-West Africa (Deutsch-Südwestafrika) – Theodor Leutwein (Landeshauptleute to 18 April, then governor)
 Togoland – August Köhler (Landeshauptleute to 18 April, then governor)

Events
 28 March – The German Reichstag builds a battleship fleet from the Fleet Act, triggering an arms race at sea with the United Kingdom.
 10 April _ 1898 Naval Law signed into German law.
 30 April – The German Fleet Association is founded in Berlin to arouse popular understanding and interest in the Imperial Navy. The government favors the construction of battleships in the Reichsmarineamt under Alfred von Tirpitz.
 5 June – Helvetia Berlin, association football club established.
 16 June – German federal election, 1898
 25 October _ WilheIm II voyages to the Levant.
 Unknown date – An industrial robot and factory automation manufacturing brand KUKA was founded in Bavaria.

Births

 4 June – Aryeh Leo Olitzki, German-born Israeli bacteriologist (died 1983)
 23 June – Karl Weinbacher, German manager and war criminal (died 1946)
 26 November – Karl Ziegler chemist, Nobel Prize in Chemistry laureate (died 1973)

Deaths
 10 March – George Müller, Prussian evangelist, founder of the Ashley Down orphanage (born 1805)
 29 May – Theodor Eimer, German zoologist (born 1843)
 30 July – Otto von Bismarck, German politician, Chancellor of Germany (born 1815)
 20 September – Theodor Fontane, German writer (born 1819)
 25 September – Hieronymous Theodor Richter, German chemist (born 1824)
 29 December – Georg Goltermann, German cellist, conductor and composer (born 1824)

References

 
Years of the 19th century in Germany
Germany
Germany